Kathryn Beck (born 1 March 1986) is an Australian television and theatre actress. In 2007, she played Lily Nelson in the soap opera Home and Away and the following year, she appeared in East of Everything. In 2013, Beck began appearing in Neighbours as Gemma Reeves. She joined the cast of Wentworth in 2014.

Biography
She was born in Brisbane, Queensland, and raised in Wellington Point, a suburb of Redland City. She attended Alexandra Hills State High School, and studied drama at Queensland University of Technology. She appeared in an advertising campaign for KFC's "Twister", before moving to Sydney and landing the role in Home and Away. In 2008, she played Lizzy Dellora in the ABC1 drama series East of Everything. In 2010 she was cast in the lead role of the successful feature-length film The Little Things directed by Nell McGregor.

She has performed in theatre work for the Griffin Theatre Company, including King Tide by Katherine Thomson in 2007. Beck joined the cast of Neighbours as Gemma Reeves in 2013. She began appearing in the second season of prison drama Wentworth in 2014. Beck plays a doctor in the comedy film Cooped Up.

Personal life
Beck is married and has one child, a daughter. In November 2018, Beck was forced to leave her house in Malibu due to the Woolsey Fire.

Filmography

Film

Television

Short works
 2005: Passive Smoker as Beth
 2009: Benefit as Karina
 2010: The Improbable Existence of Lily Bell as Lily 
 2010: Falling Fowl as Stephine Fowl
 2011: Collision as Mia
 2012: Love Untitled 
 2013: Kite as Sara
 2013: First Date  
 2014: Twisted The Girl
 2014: Flat Daddy Erica
 2015: These Final Hours as Vicky 
 2015: Batman and Jimbo as Kath
 2015: The Gap as Theresa

References

External links

1986 births
Living people
Australian film actresses
Australian soap opera actresses
Australian stage actresses
Actresses from Brisbane
Queensland University of Technology alumni
People from Redland City
21st-century Australian actresses